Mona Elisabet Seilitz née Alexandersson (16 January 1943 – 2 April 2008) was a Swedish film and television actress and entertainer. Born in Malmö, she was considered to be a veteran of both Swedish dramatic and comedic television.

Seilitz also did vocal work for a number of Swedish language cartoons. She was cast as a lead actress in three Happy Life Animation family oriented animated films – Pettson och Findus - katten och gubbens år in 1999, Pettson och Findus - Kattonauten in 2000 and Pettson och Findus 3: Tomtemaskinen in 2005.

Seilitz died of breast cancer 2 April 2008, at the age of 65.

Film and television 
 2007 – Bror och syster
 2006 – Tjocktjuven
 2003 – Belinder auktioner
 2001 – Vita lögner
 2000 – Hotel Seger
 1996 – 101 dalmatiner (voice)
 1994 – Stockholm Marathon
 1990 – Hjälten
 1989 – Miraklet i Valby
 1989 – Vildanden (TV-theater)
 1988 – Clark Kent
 1986 – Julpussar och stjärnsmällar
 1982 – Jönssonligan & Dynamit-Harry
 1982 – Gräsänklingar
 1981 – Babels hus
 1981 – Snacka går ju
 1981 – Operation Leo
 1981 – Göta kanal
 1980 – Sinkadus
 1979 – Katitzi
 1976 – Drömmen om Amerika
 1976 – Mina drömmars stad
 1975 – Giliap
 1968 – Vargtimmen (minor role)
 1968 – Fanny Hill

References

External links 

1943 births
2008 deaths
Deaths from breast cancer
People from Malmö
Swedish entertainers
Swedish film actresses
Deaths from cancer in Sweden
20th-century Swedish actresses
21st-century Swedish actresses